Somaliland elects on national level a head of state (the president)  and a legislature. The president is elected by the people for a five-year term. The Parliament (Baarlamaanka) has two chambers. The House of Representatives (Golaha Wakiilada) will have 82 members, elected for a five-year term. The House of Elders (Golaha Guurtida) will have 82 members, representing traditional leaders.
Somaliland has a multi-party system, with numerous parties in which no one party often has a chance of gaining power alone, and parties must work with each other to form coalition governments.

Latest elections

Parliamentary elections

Municipal elections

Past elections

2017 presidential election

2012 municipal elections

2010 presidential election

Elections were delayed several times, and were finally held on 26 June 2010.

2005 parliamentary election

2003 presidential election

2002 municipal elections

2001 constitutional referendum

See also
 National Electoral Commission (Somaliland)
 Electoral calendar
 Electoral system

References

External links
African Elections Database
Somaliland electoral law